Hercules vs. Moloch (also released as Conquest of Mycenae) is a 1963 Italian/French international co-production peplum film written and directed  by Giorgio Ferroni and starring Gordon Scott. The film reuses battle scenes from Ferroni's 1961 film The Trojan Horse.

Plot 
The city-state of Mycenae is able to dominate the rest of the nearby city-states due to its impregnable fortress. Led by a facially deformed King who believes himself Moloch incarnated, the madman demands slaves as tribute, where he tortures and kills a selected few. Prince Glaucus from Tiryns has an idea to seize and destroy Mycenae from within. Using the name of Hercules, he poses as one of the slaves given to Mycenae in tribute.

He becomes a gladiator, but he secretly plots to lead a revolution and destroy the creature that has enslaved the people.

Cast 
Gordon Scott as Prince Glauco (Glaucus) a.k.a. Ercole (Hercules)
Alessandra Panaro as Medea, Queen of Tiryns
Rosalba Neri as Demetra, Queen of Mycenae
Arturo Dominici as Penteo (Penthius), General of Mycenae
Michel Lemoine as Oineo (Euneos)
Jany Clair as Deianira
Nerio Bernardi as Asterione (Asterion), the High Priest
Giovanni Pazzafini as Archiloco (Archepolos)
Geneviève Grad as Pasifaë
Pietro Marascalchi as Moloch

Release 
Hercules vs. the Moloch was released in Italy on December 21, 1963. It was released in the United States by December 15, 1965.

Reception 
From contemporary reviews, the Monthly Film Bulletin reviewed a 91 minute dubbed version. The film stated that the plot was "completely routine" and its ending was  "over-extravagant", the "Herculean hero is at least credited with a distinct measure of intelligence" noting that "the question of sheer physical strength is reated ambigulously [...] There is no penny-pinching in the staging; hundreds of extras are used for the big battle scenes, which really do succeed in giving the effect of an army and not merely a platoon."

See also 
 Moloch

References

Sources

External links 

Hercules vs. Moloch at Variety Distribution

1963 adventure films
Peplum films
French historical adventure films
Films directed by Giorgio Ferroni
Films scored by Carlo Rustichelli
Films set in ancient Greece
Sword and sandal films
1960s Italian films